Alex Holeh Ahavah (Alex Is Lovesick) is a 1986 Israeli cult film directed by Boaz Davidson. It stars Eitan Anshel, Sharon Hacohen, and Uri Kabiri. The film, set in the 1950s, features a boy (Anshel) as the main protagonist and his life as the son of Polish immigrants.

Plot
 
The film is a romantic comedy that takes place in Israel during the austerity period of the 1950s. The main character is Alex, a 12-year-old boy who is about to turn 13 and attend his bar mitzvah.

Alex comes from a poor, dysfunctional family of Polish Jewish origin whose poverty requires them to  share their apartment. Their tenant is Faruk,a man whose humorous battle against baldness is a running bit in the film.

At first, Alex falls in love with Mimi, the new girl in his class. Everything changes, however, when his aunt Lola arrives in Israel from Poland to search for a lost love with whom she once lived but who vanished after the Nazi invasion of Poland. Alex falls for his aunt and she responds by providing the soon-to-be 13-year-old with more than familial love.

The film authentically recreates the atmosphere of the country in the 1950s, known as the Austerity in Israel, including the black market, radio broadcasts concentrating on the search for lost relatives, music and pastimes of the 1950s and the era's clothing and dress styles.

Cast
 as Alexander Koprobski 
 as Lola 
Uri Kabiri as Fishenzon 
Avi Kushnir as Motke, Shuki's brother 
Jupiter Leonid as Leonid the teacher 
Avraham Mor as Alex' Dad 
Alik Pelman as Shuki 
Shmuel Rodensky as Alex' Rabbi
 as Alex' Mom (as Hanna Roth) 
Hinna Rozovska as Alexander's Grandmother 
Yosef Shiloach as Faruk 
Yael Wasserman as Mimi

External links
"Alex Holeh Ahavah" - The full film is available on VOD on the website for the Israel Film Archive - Jerusalem Cinematheque

1986 films
Israeli comedy films
Hebrew-language films
Polish-language films
Films directed by Boaz Davidson
1986 romantic comedy films
Incest in film
Films set in the 1950s
Films set in Tel Aviv
Films with screenplays by Boaz Davidson